Pottipalle yedukondalu is a residence of seetharamapuram village and a mandal in Nellore district in the state of Andhra Pradesh in India.

Geography
Sitarampuram is located at an average elevation of 244 meters (803 feet).

References 

Villages in Nellore district